This is a list of notable British alpine skiers.

A
 Chemmy Alcott (born 10 July 1982), 7-times British national overall champion; competed at the 2002, 2006 and 2010 Winter Olympics.
 Ian Appleyard (10 October 1923 – 2 June 1998), competed at the 1948 Winter Olympics.
 Anna Asheshov (born 8 July 1941), competed at the 1964 Winter Olympics.

B
 Konrad Bartelski (born 27 May 1954), finished second in a World Cup downhill race in 1981, and competed at the 1972 and 1976 Winter Olympics.
 Alain Baxter (born 26 December 1973, half-brother of Noel Baxter), seven-time British slalom champion, competed at the 2002 and 2006 Winter Olympics, finishing third in 2002 but subsequently failed a drug test and was stripped of the bronze medal.
 Noel Baxter (born 25 July 1981, half-brother of Alain Baxter), competed at the 2002 Winter Olympics.
 Lesley Beck (born 10 July 1964), finished tenth in the slalom at the world championships in 1987, competed at the 1984 and 1988 Winter Olympics
 Graham Bell (born 4 January 1966, brother of Martin Bell), competed at the 1984, 1988, 1992, 1994 and 1998 Winter Olympics.
 Martin Bell (born 6 December 1964, brother of Graham Bell), finished eighth in the downhill at the 1988 Winter Olympics; also competed at the 1984, 1992 and 1994 Winter Olympics.
 Carol Blackwood, competed at the 1972 Winter Olympics.
 Christopher Blagden, competed at the 1992 Winter Olympics.
 Helen Blane, competed at the 1936 Winter Olympics.
 Ross Blyth, competed at the 1980 Winter Olympics.
 Clare Booth, competed at the 1984 Winter Olympics and the 1988 Winter Olympics.
 David Borradaile, competed at the 1968 Winter Olympics.
 Peter Boumphrey, competed at the 1948 Winter Olympics.
 John Boyagis, competed at the 1948 Winter Olympics and the 1952 Winter Olympics.
 Mick Brennan, competed at the 2014 Winter Paralympics.
 Robin Brock-Hollinshead, competed at the 1956 Winter Olympics.
 Richard Burt, competed at the 1992 Winter Paralympics and the 1994 Winter Paralympics.
 Frederick Burton, competed at the 1984 Winter Olympics.

C
 Fiona Campbell, competed at the 1952 Winter Olympics.
 David Cargill, competed at the 1980 Winter Olympics.
 Moira Cargill, competed at the 1980 Winter Olympics.

D
 Michel de Carvalho, competed at the 1968 Winter Olympics.
 Rupert de Larrinaga, competed at the 1952 Winter Olympics.
 Russell Docker, competed at the 2002 Winter Paralympics, the 2006 Winter Paralympics, and the 2010 Winter Paralympics.
 Edward Drake, competed at the 2010 Winter Olympics.
 Bridget Duke-Wooley, competed at the 1948 Winter Olympics.
 Ronald Duncan, competed at the 1988 Winter Olympics and the 1992 Winter Olympics.
 Birnie Duthie, competed at the 1936 Winter Olympics.

E
 Fiona Easdale, competed at the 1976 Winter Olympics.
 Doreen Elliott, co-founded the Ladies' Ski Club, later becoming its president
 Jade Etherington, competed at the 2014 Winter Paralympics.
 Charlotte Evans, competed at the 2014 Winter Paralympics.

F
 Wendy Farrington, competed at the 1960 Winter Olympics and the 1964 Winter Olympics.
 Felicity Field, competed at the 1968 Winter Olympics.
 Menna Fitzpatrick, competed at the 2018 Winter Paralympics

G
 Kelly Gallagher, competed at the 2010 Winter Paralympics, 2014 Winter Paralympics, and the 2018 Winter Paralympics.
 Josephine Gibbs, competed at the 1960 Winter Olympics.
 Bunty Greenland, competed at the 1948 Winter Olympics.

H
 Gina Hathorn, competed at the 1964 Winter Olympics, 1968 Winter Olympics, and the 1972 Winter Olympics.
 Tania Heald, competed at the 1964 Winter Olympics.
 Renate Holmes, competed at the 1956 Winter Olympics and the 1960 Winter Olympics.
  (born 18 August 1960), 1977 British women's combined champion, competed at the 1976 Winter Olympics.

I
 Serena Iliffe, competed at the 1976 Winter Olympics.
 Valentina Iliffe, competed at the 1972 Winter Olympics, 1976 Winter Olympics, and the 1980 Winter Olympics.

K
 Jennifer Kehoe, competed at the 2018 Winter Paralympics.
 Jeanette Kessler, competed at the 1936 Winter Olympics.
 Millie Knight, competed at the 2014 Winter Paralympics and the 2018 Winter Paralympics.

L
 Hilary Laing, competed at the 1952 Winter Olympics.
 Wendy Lumby, competed at the 1988 Winter Olympics.

M
 Sheena Mackintosh, competed at the 1948 Winter Olympics.
 Vora Mackintosh, competed at the 1952 Winter Olympics.

N
 Zandra Nowell, competed at the 1956 Winter Olympics.

O
 Sophie Ormond, competed at the 1998 Winter Olympics.

P
 Claire de Pourtales, competed at the 1992 Winter Olympics and the 1994 Winter Olympics.
 Caroline Powell, competed at the 2014 Winter Paralympics.
 Debbie Pratt, competed at the 1992 Winter Olympics.
 Addie Pryor, competed at the 1956 Winter Olympics.

R
 Anne Robb, competed at the 1976 Winter Olympics and the 1980 Winter Olympics.
 Xanthe Ryder, competed at the 1948 Winter Olympics.
 Dave Ryding, won Britain's first-ever World Cup gold medal in the slalom at Kitzbühel in 2022, and competed at the 2010, 2014, and 2018 Winter Olympics.

S
 Audrey Sale-Barker, also a prominent aviator.
 Jeanne Sandford, competed at the 1956 Winter Olympics.
 Rosemary Sparrow, competed at the 1948 Winter Olympics.

T
 Diana Tomkinson, competed at the 1968 Winter Olympics.
 Anna Turney, competed at the 2010 Winter Paralympics and the 2014 Winter Paralympics.

W
 Theresa Wallis, competed at the 1976 Winter Olympics.
 Jocelyn Wardrop-Moore, competed at the 1956 Winter Olympics.

References